The year 1958 in film in the US involved some significant events, including the hit musicals South Pacific and Gigi, the latter of which won nine Academy Awards, including Best Picture and Best Director.

Top-grossing films (U.S.)

The top ten 1958 released films by box office gross in North America are as follows:

Events
 January 29 – Ascenseur pour l'échafaud is an early example of the French New Wave; it is also notable for the improvised soundtrack by Miles Davis. Le Beau Serge is credited as the first French New Wave feature.
 February 16 – In the Money by William Beaudine is released. It will be the last installment of The Bowery Boys series which began in 1946.
 February 27 – Harry Cohn, the remaining founder of Columbia Pictures and one of the last remaining Hollywood movie moguls, dies.
 The second installment of Sergei Eisenstein's Ivan the Terrible is officially released, having previously been shelved for political reasons. It would be the last of Eisenstein's Ivan the Terrible trilogy as the director died during production on Part III.
 April – Samuel J. Briskin leaves MGM and rejoins Columbia Pictures later becoming vice president and general manager of the studio.
 April 22 – Sol C. Siegel becomes head of studio operations at MGM.
 May 15 – Metro-Goldwyn-Mayer releases Gigi, one of the last classic MGM musicals. Directed by Vincente Minnelli, produced by Arthur Freed, and written by Alan Jay Lerner, the film is released to considerable critical and commercial success and will become the highest-grossing musical ever made by Metro-Goldwyn-Mayer, until That's Entertainment! in 1974.
 May 17 – Joseph E. Levine presents a picture on his own for the first time with 1954's Attila in an all-out exploitation saturation booking in the United States earning rentals of $2 million.
 August 31 – Carry on Sergeant, the first film in the popular British Carry On series, opens.
 October – Universal Pictures sells the Universal lot to Music Corporation of America for $11.25 million and leases it back for $1 million a year.
 November 15 – During production of Solomon and Sheba in Madrid, Spain, actor Tyrone Power dies of a massive heart attack. The production of the film is halted and it is finished in late 1959. Power, who was playing the role of King Solomon, is replaced in the film by Yul Brynner.
 December 16 – MCA Inc. acquires the Universal Pictures studio lot for $11 million. It will later acquire the studio.

Awards

Notable films released in 1958
United States unless stated

A
Amar Deep, remake of Amara Deepam, starring Dev Anand, Vyjayanthimala and Padmini – (India)
Ambush at Cimarron Pass, starring Scott Brady and Clint Eastwood
And Quiet Flows the Don (Tikhiy Don) – (U.S.S.R.)
Andy Hardy Comes Home, starring Mickey Rooney
Another Time, Another Place, starring Lana Turner and Sean Connery – (Britain)
Apache Territory, starring Rory Calhoun
Appu Chesi Pappu Koodu, starring N. T. Rama Rao – (India)
Arms and the Man (Helden) – (West Germany)
Ash Wednesday (Miércoles de ceniza), starring María Félix and Arturo de Córdova – (Mexico)
Ashes and Diamonds (Popiół i diament), directed by Andrzej Wajda, starring Zbigniew Cybulski – (Poland)
Attack of the 50 Foot Woman, starring Allison Hayes
Auntie Mame, starring Rosalind Russell, Coral Browne, Forrest Tucker, Roger Smith, Peggy Cass

B
The Ballad of Narayama (Narayama Bushiko) – (Japan)
The Barbarian and the Geisha, starring John Wayne and Eiko Ando
Le Beau Serge (Handsome Serge), directed by Claude Chabrol – (France)
Bell, Book and Candle, starring James Stewart, Kim Novak, Jack Lemmon, Ernie Kovacs
The Big Country, directed by William Wyler, starring Gregory Peck, Charlton Heston, Jean Simmons, Carroll Baker, Burl Ives, Charles Bickford, Chuck Connors
Big Deal on Madonna Street (I soliti ignoti), starring Vittorio Gassman, Claudia Cardinale, Marcello Mastroianni – (Italy)
The Black Orchid, starring Sophia Loren and Anthony Quinn
The Blob, starring Steve McQueen
Bonjour Tristesse, directed by Otto Preminger, starring David Niven, Deborah Kerr, Jean Seberg
The Bonnie Parker Story, starring Dorothy Provine
The Bravados, starring Gregory Peck and Joan Collins
Brink of Life (Nära livet), directed by Ingmar Bergman, starring Eva Dahlbeck and Ingrid Thulin – (Sweden)
The Brothers Karamazov, directed by Richard Brooks, starring Yul Brynner, Maria Schell, Lee J. Cobb, Claire Bloom
The Buccaneer, directed by Anthony Quinn, starring Yul Brynner and Claire Bloom
Buchanan Rides Alone, directed by Budd Boetticher, starring Randolph Scott and Craig Stevens

C
Cairo Station (Bab el Hadid), directed by Youssef Chahine – (Egypt)
Carry On Sergeant, the first in the Carry On film series, directed by Gerald Thomas, starring William Hartnell, Kenneth Williams, Kenneth Connor – (Britain)
Carve Her Name with Pride, starring Virginia McKenna and Paul Scofield – (Britain)
The Castle of the Monsters (El Castillo de los Monstruos) – (Mexico)
Cat on a Hot Tin Roof, directed by Richard Brooks, starring Elizabeth Taylor, Paul Newman, Burl Ives, Jack Carson, Judith Anderson
A Certain Smile, starring Rossano Brazzi and Joan Fontaine
Chalti Ka Naam Gaadi (That which runs is a car), starring Ashok Kumar and Madhubala – (India)
Chase a Crooked Shadow, starring Richard Todd and Anne Baxter – (Britain)
China Doll, starring Victor Mature
The Colossus of New York, starring Ross Martin and Mala Powers
Cowboy, starring Glenn Ford and Jack Lemmon
The Crawling Eye (The Trollenberg Terror), directed by Quentin Lawrence, starring Forrest Tucker and Janet Munro – (Britain)
The Cry Baby Killer, directed by Roger Corman,  featuring Jack Nicholson in his film debut
Cry Terror!, starring James Mason, Inger Stevens, Rod Steiger, Angie Dickinson

D
Damn Yankees, directed by George Abbott and Stanley Donen, starring Tab Hunter, Gwen Verdon, Ray Walston
Darby's Rangers, directed by William Wellman, starring James Garner
The Deep Six, starring Alan Ladd, Dianne Foster, Efrem Zimbalist, Jr.
The Defiant Ones, directed by Stanley Kramer, starring Tony Curtis and Sidney Poitier
Desire (Touha) – (Czechoslovakia)
Desire Under the Elms, starring Sophia Loren, Anthony Perkins, Burl Ives
The Doctor's Dilemma, directed by Anthony Asquith, starring Dirk Bogarde (Britain)
Dracula, starring Christopher Lee and Peter Cushing – (Britain)
Dunkirk, starring John Mills and Richard Attenborough – (Britain)

E
Édes Anna, directed by Zoltán Fábri – (Hungary)
Elevator to the Gallows (Ascenseur pour l'échafaud), directed by Louis Malle, starring Jeanne Moreau – (France)
Enchanted Island, starring Jane Powell
Endless Desire (Hateshinaki yokubo), directed by Shōhei Imamura – (Japan)
Equinox Flower (Higanbana), directed by Yasujirō Ozu – (Japan)

F
The Fabulous World of Jules Verne (aka Vynález zkázy) – (Czechoslovakia)
Fanfare – (Netherlands)
Flood Tide, starring George Nader and Cornell Borchers
A Flower in Hell (Jiokhwa) – (South Korea)
The Fly, starring Vincent Price
Fort Massacre, starring Joel McCrea
From Hell to Texas, starring Don Murray, Diane Varsi, Dennis Hopper
From the Earth to the Moon, starring Joseph Cotten

G
The Geisha Boy, starring Jerry Lewis
Giants and Toys (Kyojin to gangu) – (Japan)
The Gift of Love, directed by Jean Negulesco, starring Lauren Bacall and Robert Stack
Gigi, directed by Vincente Minnelli, starring Leslie Caron, Louis Jourdan, Maurice Chevalier
Girl on the Run, starring Efrem Zimbalist, Jr.
God's Little Acre, directed by Anthony Mann, starring Robert Ryan, Aldo Ray, Fay Spain, Tina Louise
The Goddess, starring Kim Stanley
Goha, starring Omar Sharif – (France/Tunisia)
Gunman's Walk, starring Van Heflin, Tab Hunter, Kathryn Grant

H
H8 – (Yugoslavia)
The H-Man, directed by Ishirō Honda – (Japan)
Harry Black, starring Stewart Granger and Barbara Rush – (UK/US)
Hercules (Le fatiche di Ercole), starring Steve Reeves – (Italy)
The Hidden Fortress (Kakushi toride no san akunin), directed by Akira Kurosawa, starring Toshiro Mifune – (Japan)
High School Confidential, starring Russ Tamblyn, Jan Sterling, Mamie Van Doren
The Horse's Mouth, starring Alec Guinness – (Britain)
Houseboat, starring Cary Grant and Sophia Loren
Howrah Bridge, starring Madhubala and Ashok Kumar – (India)
The Hunters, starring Robert Mitchum

I
I Accuse!, directed by and starring José Ferrer – (Britain)
I Want to Live!, starring Susan Hayward (winner of Academy Award and Golden Globe for Best Actress)
I Was Monty's Double, starring M. E. Clifton James and John Mills – (Britain)
Ice Cold in Alex, directed by J. Lee Thompson, starring John Mills and Sylvia Syms – (Britain)
The Idiot – (USSR)
Imitation General, directed by George Marshall, starring Glenn Ford, Red Buttons, Taina Elg
In Case of Adversity (En Cas de Malheur), starring Jean Gabin and Brigitte Bardot – (France)
In the Money, starring the Bowery Boys
Indiscreet, starring Cary Grant and Ingrid Bergman – (Britain)
The Inn of the Sixth Happiness, directed by Mark Robson, starring Ingrid Bergman, Curd Jürgens, Robert Donat
Intent to Kill, starring Richard Todd, Betsy Drake, Herbert Lom
Iron Flower (Vasvirág) – (Hungary)
It Happened in Broad Daylight (Es geschah am hellichten Tag) – (West Germany)
It! The Terror from Beyond Space, directed by Edward L. Cahn, starring Marshall Thompson, Paul Langton and Ray Corrigan as the monster of the title
Ivan the Terrible, Part Two (Ivan Grozniy), directed by Sergei Eisenstein, starring Nikolay Cherkasov – (U.S.S.R.)

J
Jalsaghar (The Music Room), directed by Satyajit Ray – (India)

K
Kala Pani (Life Sentence), starring Dev Anand and Madhubala – (India)
The Key, starring William Holden and Sophia Loren, based on Jan de Hartog novel  – (Britain)
King Creole, directed by Michael Curtiz, starring Elvis Presley, Dean Jagger, Vic Morrow, Walter Matthau

L
Lafayette Escadrille, World War I film starring Tab Hunter, with an early appearance by Clint Eastwood
Lake of the Dead (De dødes tjern) – (Norway)
The Last Hurrah, starring Spencer Tracy, Jeffrey Hunter, Pat O'Brien, Basil Rathbone
The Law and Jake Wade, starring Robert Taylor and Richard Widmark
The Law Is the Law (La loi, c'est la loi), starring Totò and Fernandel – (France/Italy)
The Left Handed Gun, starring Paul Newman
The Light in the Forest, starring Fess Parker
The Lineup, starring Eli Wallach
Lonelyhearts, starring Montgomery Clift, Robert Ryan, Myrna Loy, Maureen Stapleton
The Long, Hot Summer, directed by Martin Ritt, starring Paul Newman, Joanne Woodward, Orson Welles, Tony Franciosa, Lee Remick
The Lovers (Les amants), directed by Louis Malle, starring Jeanne Moreau and Alain Cuny – (France)
The Lovers of Montparnasse (Les Amants de Montparnasse), directed by Jacques Becker and Max Ophüls – (France)

M
Machine-Gun Kelly, starring Charles Bronson, Susan Cabot and Morey Amsterdam
Mädchen in Uniform (Girls in Uniform), starring Lilli Palmer and Romy Schneider (West Germany)
Madhumati, directed by Bimal Roy, starring Vyjayanthimala in triple role and Dilip Kumar – (India)
The Magician (Ansiktet), directed by Ingmar Bergman, starring Max von Sydow – (Sweden)
Maigret Sets a Trap (film) (Maigret tend un piège), starring Jean Gabin – (France)
The Man Inside, starring Jack Palance and Anita Ekberg – (Britain)
A Man of Straw (L'uomo di paglia), directed by and starring Pietro Germi – (Italy)
Man of the West, directed by Anthony Mann, starring Gary Cooper, Lee J. Cobb, Jack Lord, Julie London
Marjorie Morningstar, starring Natalie Wood and Gene Kelly
The Matchmaker, starring Shirley MacLaine
Me and the Colonel, starring Danny Kaye
Merry Andrew, starring Danny Kaye
Les Misérables, starring Jean Gabin – (France)
Mon Oncle, directed by and starring Jacques Tati – (France)
Monster on the Campus, directed by Jack Arnold
Murder by Contract, starring Vince Edwards

N
The Naked Maja, starring Ava Gardner and Anthony Franciosa – (Italy/France/U.S.)
Next to No Time, starring Kenneth More and Betsy Drake – (Britain)
The Night Heaven Fell (Les Bijoutiers du Clair de Lune), directed by Roger Vadim, starring Brigitte Bardot – (France)
A Night to Remember, directed by Roy Baker, starring Kenneth More – (Britain)
No Time for Sergeants, directed by Mervyn LeRoy, starring Andy Griffith, Myron McCormick, Murray Hamilton, Nick Adams

O
The Old Man and the Sea, based on the novel by Ernest Hemingway, starring Spencer Tracy
Onionhead, starring Andy Griffith, Walter Matthau, Felicia Farr, Joey Bishop
Orders to Kill, directed by Anthony Asquith, starring Eddie Albert – (Britain)
The Outlaws (Oi paranomoi) – (Greece)

P
Paris Holiday, starring Bob Hope and Anita Ekberg
Party Girl, starring Cyd Charisse and Robert Taylor
The Perfect Furlough, starring Tony Curtis and Janet Leigh
Phagun, starring Madhubala and Bharat Bhushan – (India)
Police, starring Madhubala and Pradeep Kumar – (India)
The Proud Rebel, starring Alan Ladd and Olivia de Havilland

Q
A Question of Adultery, directed by Don Chaffey, starring Julie London, Anthony Steel, Basil Sydney, Donald Houston – (U.K.)
Queen of Outer Space, directed by Edward Bernds, starring Zsa Zsa Gabor, Eric Fleming, and Laurie Mitchell.
The Quiet American, directed by Joseph L. Mankiewicz, starring Audie Murphy and Michael Redgrave

R
Raj Tilak, remake of Vanjikottai Valiban, starring Gemini Ganesan, Vyjayanthimala and Padmini – (India)
Rally 'Round the Flag, Boys!, starring Paul Newman, Joanne Woodward, Joan Collins
The Reluctant Debutante, starring Rex Harrison, Kay Kendall, Sandra Dee
The Revenge of Frankenstein, starring Peter Cushing – (Britain)
The Rickshaw Man (Muhomatsu no issho), starring Toshiro Mifune – (Japan)
Ride a Crooked Trail, starring Audie Murphy, Gia Scala, Walter Matthau
Rock-A-Bye Baby, starring Jerry Lewis
Rosaura at 10 O'Clock (Rosaura a las 10) – (Argentina)
Run Silent, Run Deep, directed by Robert Wise, starring Clark Gable and Burt Lancaster

S
Saddle the Wind, starring Robert Taylor, Julie London, John Cassavetes
Sadhna, starring Vyjayanthimala and Sunil Dutt – (India)
Screaming Mimi, starring Anita Ekberg
Separate Tables, starring Rita Hayworth, Deborah Kerr, Burt Lancaster, David Niven
The 7th Voyage of Sinbad, starring Kerwin Mathews
The Sheepman, starring Glenn Ford and Shirley MacLaine
The Sheriff of Fractured Jaw, starring Jayne Mansfield and Kenneth More – (Britain)
The Sign of Zorro
Sing, Boy, Sing, directed by Henry Ephron, starring Tommy Sands
Solva Saal (Sixteenth Year), starring Dev Anand – (India)
Some Came Running, directed by Vincente Minnelli, starring Frank Sinatra, Dean Martin, Shirley MacLaine
South Pacific, directed by Joshua Logan, starring Mitzi Gaynor, Rossano Brazzi, John Kerr, Ray Walston
Stage Struck, starring Henry Fonda and Susan Strasberg
Stakeout on Dope Street, starring Abby Dalton
St. Louis Blues, featuring Nat King Cole, Eartha Kitt, Cab Calloway, Ella Fitzgerald
St. Peter's Umbrella (Szent Péter esernyöje) – (Hungary/Czechoslovakia)
Summer Love, starring John Saxon and Jill St. John

T
A Tale of Two Cities, starring Dirk Bogarde – (Britain)
Tamango, starring Dorothy Dandridge
The Tarnished Angels, starring Rock Hudson and Dorothy Malone
Teacher's Pet, starring Clark Gable, Doris Day, Gig Young, Mamie Van Doren
Ten North Frederick, starring Gary Cooper and Suzy Parker
Terror in a Texas Town, starring Sterling Hayden
This Happy Feeling, starring Debbie Reynolds, John Saxon, Alexis Smith
Thunder Road, starring Robert Mitchum, Gene Barry, Keely Smith
A Time to Love and a Time to Die, starring John Gavin
The Tinder Box (Das Feuerzeug) – (East Germany)
Tom Thumb, starring Russ Tamblyn and Terry-Thomas – (Britain/US)
Too Much, Too Soon, starring Dorothy Malone, Efrem Zimbalist, Jr., Errol Flynn
Torpedo Run, starring Glenn Ford and Ernest Borgnine
Touch of Evil, directed by and starring Orson Welles, with Charlton Heston, Janet Leigh,  Marlene Dietrich
Tread Softly Stranger, starring Diana Dors – (Britain)
The True Story of Lynn Stuart, starring Betsy Palmer
The Tunnel of Love, starring Doris Day and Richard Widmark
Twilight for the Gods, starring Rock Hudson and Cyd Charisse

U
Underworld Beauty (Ankokugai no bijo) – (Japan)

V
Vanjikottai Valiban (The Youth from Vanji Fort), starring Gemini Ganesan, Vyjayanthimala and Padmini – (India)
Varan the Unbelievable (Daikaijū Baran), directed by Ishirō Honda – (Japan)
Vengeance (La venganza), directed by Juan Antonio Bardem, starring Raf Vallone – (Spain)
Vertigo, directed by Alfred Hitchcock, starring James Stewart and Kim Novak
The Vikings, starring Kirk Douglas, Tony Curtis, Janet Leigh
The Village on the River (Dorp aan de rivier) – (Netherlands)
Virgin Island, starring John Cassavetes, Virginia Maskell and Sidney Poitier (UK)

W
White Wilderness, a Disney nature film

Y
The Young Lions, directed by Edward Dmytryk, starring Marlon Brando, Montgomery Clift, Dean Martin

Film series
Carry On series (1958–1992)

Short film series
Looney Tunes (1930–1969)
Terrytoons (1930–1969)
Merrie Melodies (1931–1969)
The Three Stooges (1934–1959)
Bugs Bunny (1940–1962)
Yosemite Sam (1945–1963)
Speedy Gonzales (1953–1968)
Woody Woodpecker (1940–1972)

Ending this year
Droopy (1943-1958)
Tom and Jerry (1940-1958)

Births
January 4
Matt Frewer, Canadian-American actor, singer and comedian
Julian Sands, English actor
January 7 - Linda Kozlowski, American former actress
January 8 - George Jackson (filmmaker), American director and producer (d. 2000)
January 11 - Alyson Reed, American actress
January 20 – Lorenzo Lamas, American actor
January 21 - Michael Wincott, Canadian actor
January 26 – Ellen DeGeneres, American actress and comedian
February 2 - Douglas McGrath, American screenwriter, director and actor (d. 2022)
February 6 - Cecily Adams, American actress and casting director (d. 2004)
February 10 - Bess Motta, American actress and singer
February 13
Donal Gibson, American former actor
Pernilla August, Swedish actress
February 16 - Ice-T, American rapper, songwriter, actor and producer
February 19
Leslie David Baker, American actor
Pierre-Loup Rajot, French actor and director 
February 21
Kim Coates, Canadian-American actor
Denise Dowse, American actress and director (d. 2022)
February 26
Greg Germann, American actor
Chris Phillips (voice actor), American voice actor
March 3 – Miranda Richardson, English actress
March 7 - Rik Mayall, English actor, comedian and writer (d. 2014)
March 10 – Sharon Stone, American actress and producer
March 14 - Russell Todd, American former actor
March 18 - Christian Clemenson, American actor
March 19 - Fred Stoller, American actor and stand-up comedian
March 20 – Holly Hunter, American actress
March 21 – Gary Oldman, English actor and filmmaker
March 29 – Anu Lamp, Estonian actress
March 30 - Maurice LaMarche, Canadian actor and stand-up comedian
March 31 - Tony Cox (actor), American actor
April 3
Alec Baldwin, American actor
Jaan Rekkor, Estonian actor 
April 14 – Peter Capaldi, Scottish actor, writer and director
April 19 - Steve Antin, American actor, stunt performer, producer and director
April 21 – Andie MacDowell, American actress
April 26 - Giancarlo Esposito, American actor
April 29 – Michelle Pfeiffer, American actress	
May 7 – Mayra Alejandra, Venezuelan actress (d. 2014)
May 9 - Lorena Gale, Canadian actress (d. 2009)
May 12 – Tony Oliver, Puerto Rican voice actor
May 16
Laurie Bartram, American actress and ballet dancer (d. 2007)
Don Fullilove, American actor  
May 20 - Judy Kuhn, American actress, singer and activist
May 23
 Drew Carey, American actor, voice actor, comedian, sports executive and game show host
 Lea DeLaria, American comedian, actress and jazz singer
May 26 - Margaret Colin, American actress
May 29 – Annette Bening, American actress
May 30 - Ted McGinley, American actor
June 8 - Keenen Ivory Wayans, American actor, comedian and filmmaker
June 17 - Kerry Shale, Canadian actor, voice-over artist and writer
June 20 – Paul Poom, Estonian actor
June 21 - Eric Douglas, American actor and stand-up comedian (d. 2004)
June 22 – Bruce Campbell, American actor and director
June 24 - Tommy Lister Jr., American character actor and professional wrestler (d. 2020)
June 25 - Igal Naor, Israeli actor
July 4 – Tõnu Oja, Estonian actor
July 6 – Jennifer Saunders, English comedian, screenwriter, singer and actress
July 8 – Kevin Bacon, American actor
July 10 - Fiona Shaw, Irish actress and theatre and opera director
July 27 - Vincenzo Nicoli, English-Italian actor
July 30 - Richard Burgi, American actor
August 3 – Lambert Wilson, French actor
August 7 - Pete Smith (actor), New Zealand actor (d. 2022)
August 8 - Harry Crosby (businessman), American investment banker and former actor
August 9 – Arvo Kukumägi, Estonian actor (d. 2017)
August 10 - Don Swayze, American character actor
August 15
Nicholas Bell, English actor
Roger Rose, American actor
August 16 
Angela Bassett, American actress
Madonna, American pop singer and actress
Toby Sedgwick, English actor and theatre director
August 18
Reg E. Cathey, American character actor (d. 2018)
Madeleine Stowe, American actress
August 22 – Colm Feore, Canadian actor
August 24 – Steve Guttenberg, American actor and comedian
August 25 – Tim Burton, American director, producer and screenwriter
August 29 
Lenny Henry, British stand-up comedian, actor, singer, writer and television presenter
Michael Jackson, American pop singer and actor (d. 2009)
August 31 - Julie Brown, American actress, comedian, writer, singer and director
September 6 – Michael Winslow, American actor, beatboxer, and comedian
September 10 – Chris Columbus, American director, producer and screenwriter
September 15 - Wendie Jo Sperber, American actress (d. 2005)
September 16 – Jennifer Tilly, Canadian-American actress
September 19 - Richard Ridings, English actor
September 24 - Kevin Sorbo, American actor
October 2 - Jeffrey Weissman, American actor
October 4 - Ned Luke, American actor
October 9 – Michael Paré, American actor
October 15 - Renée Jones, American former actress
October 16 – Tim Robbins, American actor, screenwriter, producer and director
October 19 - Tiriel Mora, Australian actor
October 20 – Viggo Mortensen, Danish actor
October 25 - Phil Daniels, English actor
November 1 - Rachel Ticotin, American actress
November 5 – Robert Patrick, American actor
November 11 - Scott Plank, American actor (d. 2002)
November 12 - Megan Mullally, American actress, comedian and singer
November 16 – Marg Helgenberger, American actress
November 17 – Mary Elizabeth Mastrantonio, American actress and singer
November 18 - Oscar Nunez, Cuban-American actor
November 22 – Jamie Lee Curtis, American actress
November 28 - Thom Mathews, American actor
December 6 - Nick Park, British director, producer and animator
December 11 - Tom Shadyac, American director, screenwriter and producer
December 13 - Lynn-Holly Johnson, American retired figure skater and actress
December 16 - Katie Leigh, American voice actress
December 22 - Lenny Von Dohlen, American actor (d. 2022)
December 25 - Cheryl Chase (actress), American voice actress
December 29 - Tyrone Benskin, English-Canadian actor
December 30 – Pedro Costa, Portuguese director
December 31- Bebe Neuwirth, American Actress

Deaths
January 3 – Charles Williams, 59, American actor, writer, It's a Wonderful Life, Parole, Inc.
January 11 – Edna Purviance, 62, American actress, The Kid, A Woman of Paris
January 13 – Jesse L. Lasky, 77, American producer, Wings, The Cocoanuts
February 13 – Helen Twelvetrees, 49, American actress, A Bedtime Story, Now I'll Tell
February 15 – William Berke, 54, American director, Dick Tracy, FBI Girl
February 17 – Tala Birell, 50, Romanian actress, Women in the Night, Dangerous Millions
February 20 – Thurston Hall, 75, American actor, We Have Our Moments, Chain Gang
February 27 – Harry Cohn, 66, American film executive, co-founder of CBC Sales Association (Columbia Pictures), Platinum Blonde, American Madness
March 22 
Mike Todd, 48, American producer, Around the World in 80 Days, This Is Cinerama
Art Cohn, 48, American screenwriter, The Set-Up, Ten Thousand Bedrooms
April 9 – Sol M. Wurtzel, 67, American producer, Charlie Chan in Rio, Bright Eyes 
April 15 – Estelle Taylor, 63, American actress, Cimarron, The Ten Commandments
May 2 – Henry Cornelius, 44, South African director, Genevieve, I Am a Camera
May 9 – Bill Goodwin, 47, American actor, announcer Mickey, The Atomic Kid
May 19 – Ronald Colman, 67, British actor, Lost Horizon, Random Harvest
June 6 – Virginia Pearson, 72, American actress, The Phantom of the Opera, The Wizard of Oz
June 9 – Robert Donat, 53, British actor, The 39 Steps, Goodbye, Mr. Chips
June 27 – Robert Greig, 78, Australian actor, They Just Had to Get Married, Love, Honor and Goodbye
July 11 – Evelyn Varden, 65, American actress, The Night of the Hunter, Ten Thousand Bedrooms
July 20 – Franklin Pangborn, 69, American actor, Never Give a Sucker an Even Break, The Bank Dick
August 1 – Albert E. Smith, 83, English director and producer, co-founder of Vitagraph Studios
August 8 – Barbara Bennett, 51, American actress, Black Jack, Syncopation
August 18 – Bonar Colleano, 34, British actor, Eight Iron Men, Joe MacBeth
August 21 – Kurt Neumann, 50, German director, The Fly, Mohawk
August 27 – Priscilla Lawson, 44, American actress, Flash Gordon, Rose Bowl
October 4 – Ida Wüst, 74, German actress, Chamber Music
November 15 – Tyrone Power, 44, American actor, Witness for the Prosecution, The Mark of Zorro
December 1 – Boots Mallory, 45, American actress, Sing Sing Nights, Here's Flash Casey
December 20 – Elisabeth Risdon, 71, British actress, Florence Nightingale, Five Came Back
December 21 – H. B. Warner, 83, British actor, Lost Horizon, It's a Wonderful Life

Film debuts 
Claudia Cardinale – Goha
Veronica Cartwright – In Love and War
Patty Duke – Country Music Holiday
Peter Falk – Wind Across the Everglades
Nigel Hawthorne – Carve Her Name with Pride
Ian Holm – Girls at Sea
Don Knotts – No Time for Sergeants
Jack Nicholson – The Cry Baby Killer
Suzanne Pleshette – The Geisha Boy
Christopher Plummer – Stage Struck
Vanessa Redgrave – Behind the Mask
Oliver Reed – The Square Peg
Don Rickles – Run Silent, Run Deep
Gena Rowlands – The High Cost of Loving
John Williams (film composer) – Daddy-O

References 

 
Film by year